Robert Lewis "Bob" Cattrall (born 10 October 1957) is a former British field hockey player, who won the bronze medal with the British team at the 1984 Summer Olympics in Los Angeles, California. He was educated at Felsted School. He played his club hockey for Southgate Hockey Club.

External links
 
 
 

1957 births
Living people
People from Braintree, Essex
British male field hockey players
Olympic field hockey players of Great Britain
Field hockey players at the 1984 Summer Olympics
Olympic medalists in field hockey
Medalists at the 1984 Summer Olympics
Olympic bronze medallists for Great Britain
Southgate Hockey Club players